Gulf Trace is a public elementary school founded on August 20, 2007, in Holiday, Florida. It was Florida's first Green LEED (Leadership and Energy and Environmental Design) school and is a part of the Pasco County School System. The school mascot is the "Sea Star" and their school colors are blue and gold.

Mission
We will inspire one another to achieve personal goals by creating a respectful, responsible, safe and cooperative environment which will guarantee lifelong successes.

Awards
The US Green Building Council certified the school as a LEED Silver building in May 2008, shortly after completion of the $13 million school, making it the first school in Florida to win this certification.

Gulf Trace has also been certified Energy Star efficient, the first building in Pasco County to receive this rating and the first school in the Tampa Bay area.

In 2011, Gulf Trace Elementary was recognized by the Florida Department of Education (FDOE) as a Five Star School, for the fourth year in a row. This prestigious award is FDOE's highest for community and parent involvement. To qualify, the school had to have earned a grade of "C" or above in addition to 100% achievement of the required criteria in Business Partnerships, Family Involvement, Volunteers, Student Community Service, and School Advisory Councils.

Gulf Trace also was awarded the FDOE's Golden School Award for the 2010–2011 school year. To achieve this they had to have at least 80% of the staff trained in volunteerism, have a designated School Volunteer Coordinator, and the total volunteer hours for the school equal at least twice the number of students enrolled.

Principals of Gulf Trace
 Hope Schooler, 2007 - 2019 (retired)
 Dawn Scilex, 2019–present

References

Bibliography
 
 
 
 
 

Schools in Pasco County, Florida
Public elementary schools in Florida
Educational institutions established in 2007
2007 establishments in Florida